The Australia women's national volleyball team, also known as Volleyball Team Australia Women (VTAW) or the Volleyroos, is the national volleyball team of the volleyball playing nation of Australia. As of January 2021, they are ranked 40th in the world. They are a member of the Asian Volleyball Confederation (AVC).

The Australian Women’s program maintained during the 1990s ranked 6th in the Asian zone, due in part to the strong nature of women’s volleyball in Asia, with teams like China, Japan and Korea ranked in the world at the time in the top 8. With the support of the Australian Institute of Sport (AIS), they achieved 9th place in the 2000 Summer Olympics. Following this the Volleyroos achieved its highest-ever world ranking of 14th. They then achieved a 6th-place finish at the 2001 Asian Championships, and qualified for a second World Championships.

Their historic inclusion in the 2014 Women’s Grand Prix challenged the Volleyroos skills with higher world ranked competitors.

Tournament history
A red box around the year indicates tournaments played within Australia

Olympic Games
The women's Volleyroos made their Olympic Games debut as host sport nation at the 2000 Summer Olympics. They have yet to return to Olympic competition.

World Championships
Australia have participated twice internationally: and 2002.

1982 World Championship (Peru) – Finishing 12th out of 23 teams.
2002 World Championship (Germany) – Finishing 21st out of 24 teams.

Asian Championships
The first Asian Volleyball Championship was held in Melbourne, 1975, where Australia placed 4th. They came 4th again in 1979. These were the best placings in this competition. The team has always placed within the top 10 throughout its history in this tournament.

Asian Cup
 2008 — 7th place
 2010 — Did not participate
 2012 — Did not participate
 2014 — Did not participate
 2016 — Did not participate
 2018 — 7th place
 2020 — Cancelled due to COVID-19 pandemic
 2022 — 8th place

World Grand Prix
Australia played in the 2016 FIVB Volleyball World Grand Prix, one of 28 participating countries. They were in Group 3, featuring Cuba, Algeria, Peru, Croatia, Kazakhstan, Colombia, and Mexico.

Results table below. The first 3 matches were played in Bendigo, Victoria, and the last 3 matches played in Cali, Colombia.

Pool B3

Venue:  Bendigo Stadium, Bendigo, Australia

|}

Pool C3

Venue:  Coliseo Evangelista Mora, Cali, Colombia

|}

Current roster

References

 

National women's volleyball teams
volleyball
Volleyball in Australia